Sparganium angustifolium is a species of flowering plant in the cat-tail family known by the common names floating bur-reed and narrowleaf bur-reed. It has a circumboreal distribution, occurring throughout the northern latitudes of the Northern Hemisphere. It is an aquatic plant, growing in water up to 2.5 meters deep. Its habitat includes acidic, low-nutrient freshwater bodies such as ponds, lakes, slow-moving streams, and ditches. It can become abundant, practically covering the surface of the water. It is a perennial herb producing a floating stem with long, narrow, flattened leaves which can be quite long, sometimes reaching over two meters. It is monoecious, individual plants bearing both male and female inflorescences. These are spherical, the male inflorescence a ball of stamens and the female inflorescence a ball of developing fruits.

References

External links

Jepson Manual Treatment
Washington Burke Museum
Photo gallery

angustifolium